City of Beautiful Nonsense is a 1935 British drama film directed by Adrian Brunel and starring Emlyn Williams, Sophie Stewart and Eve Lister.  The film is based on the best-selling 1909 novel of the same name by E. Temple Thurston, which had previously been filmed as a silent by Henry Edwards in 1919.  The plot deals with a young woman who is in love with a penniless composer, but believes she must marry a wealthy man to please her father and only realises after various tribulations that she should follow her heart rather than her head.

Cast
 Emlyn Williams as Jack Grey
 Sophie Stewart as Jill Dealtry
 Eve Lister as Amber
 George Carney as Chesterton
 Marie Wright as Dorothy Grey
 Eric Maturin as Robert Downing
 J. Fisher White as Thomas Grey
 Daisy Dormer as Mrs. Deakin
 Hubert Harben as Mr. Dealtry
 Margaret Damer as Mrs. Dealtry
 Dorothy Vernon as Mrs. Rowse

References

External links 
 
 City of Beautiful Nonsense at BFI Film & TV Database

1935 films
1935 drama films
British drama films
Films directed by Adrian Brunel
Lost British films
British black-and-white films
Films based on Irish novels
Films scored by Eric Spear
1930s British films